The Einstein House in Fresno, California, at 1600 M St., was designed by architect Edward T. Foulkes and was built in 1912. It was the home of the banker and merchant Louis Einstein.

It has also been known as Y.W.C.A. Activity Unit.

References

National Register of Historic Places in Fresno County, California
Greek Revival architecture in California
Residential buildings completed in 1912